Paul J. Smith (October 30, 1906 – January 25, 1985) was an American music composer and violinist best known for his work at Disney.

Life and career

Smith was born in Calumet, Michigan on October 30, 1906. Upon graduating high school, he studied music at The College of Idaho from 1923 to 1925 before he was accepted into the Bush Conservatory of Music in Chicago, Illinois. His abilities in theory and composition earned him a scholarship to study music theory at Juilliard, however, it is unclear if he ever pursued this invitation.

Smith spent much of his life working at Disney as composer for many of its films' scores, animated and live-action alike, movie and television alike; from 1962 to 1963, he also composed music for Leave It to Beaver. In Fantasia, he is one of the studio employees in the orchestra. He also composed the scores for several of the True-Life Adventures episodes.

In 1950, Smith and Oliver Wallace composed the musical score of Disney's Cinderella.

Smith's main collaborator and partner was Hazel "Gil" George, who wrote the song title for The Light in the Forest with him and Lawrence Edward Watkin. Another one of Smith's collaborator was George Bruns who worked with him on films like Westward Ho the Wagons!. Smith also did the stock music for the Blondie series of the late 1940s and early 1950s.  He won an Academy Award for Best Original Score with Leigh Harline and Ned Washington for Pinocchio, which was his first and only Oscar win. Smith received seven more Oscar nominations for Snow White and the Seven Dwarfs, Saludos Amigos, Victory Through Air Power, The Three Caballeros, Song of the South, Cinderella and Perri.

Death

Smith died on January 25, 1985, in Glendale, California, from Alzheimer's disease at age 78. In 1994, he was posthumously honored as a Disney Legend.

Animation scores 

Thru the Mirror, 1936
Don Donald, 1937
Snow White and the Seven Dwarfs, 1937
Donald's Nephews, 1938
The Practical Pig, 1939
Pinocchio, 1940
Bone Trouble, 1940
Fantasia, 1940 (violinist in orchestra)
Fire Chief, 1940
Pluto's Playmate, 1941
Canine Caddy, 1941
A Gentleman's Gentleman, 1941
The Reluctant Dragon (additional music)
Donald Gets Drafted, 1942
Bambi, 1942 (orchestration)
Saludos Amigos, 1942
Fall Out Fall In, 1943
Victory Through Air Power, 1943
The Old Army Game, 1943
Donald's Off Day, 1944
Tiger Trouble, 1945
The Three Caballeros, 1945
The Eyes Have It, 1945
Californy'er Bust, 1945
Hockey Homicide, 1945
The Lady Said No, 1946
Song of the South, 1946 (cartoon segments)
Fun and Fancy Free, 1947
Mail Dog, 1947
Melody Time, 1948 (Pecos Bill and Johnny Appleseed)
So Dear to My Heart, 1949
Toy Tinkers, 1949
Cinderella, 1950
Trailer Horn, 1950
Puss Cafe, 1950
Motor Mania, 1950
Pests of the West, 1950
Food For Feudin, 1950
Hook, Lion and Sinker, 1950
Camp Dog, 1950
Hold That Pose, 1950
Lion Down, 1951
Dude Duck, 1951
Test Pilot Donald, 1951
Lucky Number, 1951
R'Coon Dawg, 1951
Get Rich Quick, 1951
Cold Turkey, 1951
Fathers Are People, 1951
Out of Scale, 1951
No Smoking, 1951
Two-Gun Goofy, 1952
Susie the Little Blue Coupe, 1952
The Little House, 1952
Father's Day Off, 1953
The Simple Things, 1953
The Jounery Mistery Of Boob, 1963

Live-action theatrical film scores 

Glamour Girl, 1948
The Strange Mrs. Crane, 1948
Love Happy, 1949 (conductor)
In Beaver Valley, 1950 includes "Jing-a-Ling", lyrics added by Don Raye
Pecos River, 1951
About Face, 1952
Water Birds, 1952
The Living Desert, 1953
The Vanishing Prairie, 1954
20,000 Leagues Under the Sea, 1954
The Great Locomotive Chase, 1956
Secrets of Life, 1956
Westward Ho, the Wagons!, 1956
Perri, 1957
The Light in the Forest, 1958 
The Shaggy Dog, 1959
Pollyanna, 1960
Swiss Family Robinson, 1960
The Parent Trap, 1961
Moon Pilot, 1962
Bon Voyage!, 1962
In Search of the Castaways, 1962
Miracle of the White Stallions, 1963
Yellowstone Cubs, 1963
The Three Lives of Thomasina, 1963

References

Film Composers in America, A. Filmography 1911- 1970 by Clifford McCarthy

External links 
 

1906 births
1985 deaths
American film score composers
American male film score composers
Animated film score composers
Best Original Music Score Academy Award winners
College of Idaho alumni
Walt Disney Animation Studios people
People from Calumet, Michigan
Deaths from Alzheimer's disease
Deaths from dementia in California
Musicians from Michigan
20th-century American composers
20th-century American male musicians